Giovanni Francesco Guidi di Bagno (1578–1641) (also known as Gian Francesco Guidi di Bagno, Gianfrancesco Guidi di Bagno, Giovanni Francesco Bagni or Gianfrancesco de' Conti Guidi di Bagno) was an Italian cardinal, brother of cardinal Nicola Guidi di Bagno and nephew of cardinal Girolamo Colonna.

Biography
He was born in Florence (Grand Duchy of Tuscany) 4 October 1578, eldest son of Fabrizio Guidi di Bagno, Marquess of Montebello, Province of Rimini, and Laura Colonna from the Duchy of Zagarolo.

Giovanni Francesco Guidi di Bagno studied law at the universities of Pisa and Bologne, literature and philosophy at the universities of Pisa and Florence and acquired a doctorate in both civil law and church law (Doctor utriusque juris).

In 1596, he received the commendation of the Abbey of St Mary of Mater Domini near Salerno. In 1597, he was appointed Protonotary apostolic, member of the college of protonotarii apostolici de numero participantium which was facilitated by his kinship with Cardinals Marcantonio and Ascanio Colonna.

In 1598 he was part of the Pope Clement VIII's retinue during his visit to Ferrara immediately after the devolution of the Duchy of Ferrara to the Papal States. In 1600 he was referendary in the Supreme Tribunal of the Apostolic Signatura. 

Vice-Legate in the Marches and in Fermo from 1601 to 1606, Giovanni Francesco Guidi di Bagno was Governor of Orvieto (1607), Fano (1608), Fermo (1610) and of the Campagne and Maritime Province (1611).

In 1614, he was elected titular archbishop of Patras and appointed vice-legate of Avignon. The same year he became referendary of the Tribunals of the Apostolic Signature of Justice and of Grace.

Twice nuncio extraordinary in France in the pontificates of Pope Gregory XV and Pope Urban VIII, he was also nuncio at the Brussels court of the Infanta Isabella Clara Eugenia, 1621–1627.

He was elevated cardinal and reserved in pectore in 1627 and installed in 1631.

In 1630 in Paris, Cardinal Guidi di Bagno met Gabriel Naudé who became his librarian and secretary and accompanied him in 1631 to Italy, and René Descartes highly appreciated him.

He was appointed bishop of Rieti in 1635 and resigned in 1639.

He was buried in the church Santi Bonifacio e Alessio.

References

1578 births
1641 deaths
Clergy from Florence
17th-century Italian cardinals
Cardinal-nephews
Cardinals created by Pope Urban VIII
17th-century Italian Roman Catholic bishops
Apostolic Nuncios to France
Apostolic Nuncios to Flanders
Diplomats from Florence